28 athletes (23 men and 5 women) from Slovakia competed at the 1996 Summer Paralympics in Atlanta, United States.

Medallists

See also
Slovakia at the Paralympics
Slovakia at the 1996 Summer Olympics

References 

Nations at the 1996 Summer Paralympics
1996
Summer Paralympics